The 2022 Viterra Championship, Manitoba's provincial men's curling championship, was held from February 9 to 13 at the Selkirk Curling Club in Selkirk. The winning Mike McEwen represented Manitoba at the 2022 Tim Hortons Brier.

The event was originally supposed to begin on January 25, but was postponed due to the COVID-19 pandemic in Manitoba.  Its new dates in February were later green lit by provincial health officials, in January 2022, and will not be cancelled as the 2021 edition had been due to the COVID-19 pandemic in Manitoba. The event was also originally going to be played at the Selkirk Recreation Complex, but was moved to the Selkirk Curling Club. The event only had 28 teams instead of the regular 32, as the last four qualifying spots could not be filled due to event cancellations due to the pandemic.

Teams
The teams are listed as follows:

Knockout brackets
Source:

28 team double knockout with playoff round
Four teams qualify each from A Event and B Event

A event

B event
{{16TeamBracket-Compact-NoSeeds-Byes
| RD1 = Second Knockout
| RD2 =  
| RD3 =  
| RD4 = Qualifier 5
| team-width = 125px

| RD1-team05 = Evan Martin
| RD1-score05 = 4
| RD1-team06 = Jack Hykaway
| RD1-score06 = 7

| RD2-team01 = Randy Neufeld
| RD2-score01 = 1
| RD2-team02 = J. T. Ryan
| RD2-score02 = 8
| RD2-team03 = Jack Hykaway
| RD2-score03 = 7
| RD2-team04 = Grant Shewfelt
| RD2-score04 = 4

| RD3-team01 = J. T. Ryan| RD3-score01 = 9| RD3-team02 = Jack Hykaway
| RD3-score02 = 4

| RD4-team01 = J. T. Ryan
| RD4-score01 = 4
| RD4-team02 = Jason Gunnlaugson| RD4-score02 = 8'}}

Knockout results
All draw times listed in Central Time (UTC−06:00).

Draw 1Wednesday, February 9, 8:30 amDraw 2Wednesday, February 9, 12:15 pmDraw 3Wednesday, February 9, 4:00 pmDraw 4Wednesday, February 9, 8:15 pmDraw 5Thursday, February 10, 8:30 amDraw 6Thursday, February 10, 12:15 pmDraw 7Thursday, February 10, 4:00 pmDraw 8Thursday, February 10, 8:15 pmDraw 9Friday, February 11, 8:30 amDraw 10Friday, February 11, 12:15 pmDraw 11Friday, February 11, 4:00 pmPlayoff round8 team double knockoutFour teams qualify into Championship RoundA bracket

Draw 12Friday, February 11, 7:45 pmDraw 13Saturday, February 12, 9:00 amB bracket

Draw 13Saturday, February 12, 9:00 amDraw 14Saturday, February 12, 2:00 pmChampionship Round

1 vs. 2Saturday, February 12, 6:00 pm3 vs. 4Saturday, February 12, 6:00 pmSemifinalSunday, February 13, 9:00 amFinalSunday, February 13, 2:30 pm''

References

External links
Official site

2022 Tim Hortons Brier
Curling competitions in Manitoba
2022 in Manitoba
Viterra Championship
Sport in Selkirk, Manitoba